Diabrotica cristata, the black diabrotica, is a species of skeletonizing leaf beetle in the family Chrysomelidae. It is found in North America.

References

Further reading

External links

Galerucinae
Articles created by Qbugbot
Beetles described in 1836
Taxa named by Thaddeus William Harris